Wellington Point railway station is located on the Cleveland line in Queensland, Australia. It serves the suburb of Wellington Point in the City of Redland.

History
In 1889, the Cleveland line was extended from Manly to the original Cleveland station.

Wellington Point station opened in 1889 at the same time as the line. On 1 November 1960, the station closed when the line was truncated to Lota. The station reopened on 26 July 1986, and served as an interim terminus as the line was being rebuilt to Cleveland.

Services
Wellington Point is served by Cleveland line services from Shorncliffe, Northgate, Doomben and Bowen Hills to Cleveland.

Services by platform

References

External links

Wellington Point station Queensland's Railways on the Internet
[ Wellington Point station] TransLink travel information

Railway stations in Redland City
Railway stations in Australia opened in 1889
Wellington Point, Queensland